Julen är här may refer to:

Julen är här, 1989 Tommy Körberg album
Julen är här, Christmas song written by Billy Butt och Sölve Rydell
Julen är här, 1988 Small, Fat 'n Beautiful Christmas song
Julen är här, Swedish language-lyrics version of Rockin' Around the Christmas Tree